The Guaramacal salamander (Bolitoglossa guaramacalensis), also known as the holy-mountain salamander, is a species of salamander in the family Plethodontidae. It is endemic to the Cordillera de Mérida, Venezuela. The Venezuelan specimen first reported as Bolitoglossa savagei likely represents this species. The species is named after its type locality, Guaramacal in the Trujillo.

Description
Based on the type series consisting of two females and one male, adult males measure  and females  in snout–vent length. The tail is slightly shorter or longer than the body. The hands and feet are moderately webbed. The dorsum is heavily pigmented, with paler reddish orange or pale yellow blotches or longitudinal streaks.

Habitat and conservation
It is a terrestrial species found on rocks, or more rarely, in bromeliads. It is a common species but with small range, making it susceptible stochastic threats.

References

Bolitoglossa
Endemic fauna of Venezuela
Amphibians of Venezuela
Taxonomy articles created by Polbot
Amphibians described in 2002